Old Dominion is the third studio album by the American country music band of the same name. It was released on October 25, 2019 via RCA Records Nashville.

Content
The band announced the album's release in July 2019. At the time, the album had produced two singles: "Make It Sweet" and "One Man Band", the latter of which the band debuted on Good Morning America following the release announcement. The band promoted the album throughout 2019 on the Make It Sweet Tour.

On August 7, 2020, the band released a "meow mix" of the album, featuring all of the vocals replaced with the word "meow".

Critical reception
Giving it 4 out of 5 stars, Stephen Thomas Erlewine of AllMusic wrote that " Old Dominion aren't ashamed that they provide music for romance and relaxation, and the fact that they don't seem to be trying quite so hard this third time around makes their eponymous album feel natural and, yes, more like themselves."

Commercial performance
Old Dominion debuted at number nine on the US Billboard 200 with 31,000 album-equivalent units, including 19,000 pure album sales. It is Old Dominion's second US top-10 album.  It has a further 5,000 in pure album sales the second week. It has sold 59,400 copies in the United States, with 379,000 units consumed in total as of March 2020.

Track listing

Personnel

Old Dominion
Matthew Ramsey – electric guitar, lead vocals, background vocals
Trevor Rosen – acoustic guitar, piano, background vocals
Whit Sellers – drums, percussion, background vocals
Geoff Sprung – bass guitar, background vocals
Brad Tursi – acoustic guitar, electric guitar, background vocals

Additional musicians
Dave Cohen – Hammond B-3 organ, piano, synthesizer, Wurlitzer
David Huff – programming
Justin Niebank – programming

Charts

Weekly charts

Year-end charts

Certifications

References

2019 albums
Old Dominion (band) albums
RCA Records albums
Albums produced by Shane McAnally